Chronicles of the Gray House is a 1925 German silent historical drama film directed by Arthur von Gerlach and starring Paul Hartmann, Rudolf Forster and Lil Dagover.

It is also known as At the Grey House. The narrative is set in the 17th century and follows the intrigues when the son of a feudal landowner falls in love with the daughter of one of the serfs, causing his younger brother to see an opportunity for himself. The screenplay by Thea von Harbou is based on Theodor Storm's novella A Chapter in the History of Grieshuus.

Erich Pommer produced the film for Universum Film AG. Principal photography took place from May 1923 to November 1924 around the Lüneburg Heath and Neubabelsberg. The film's sets were designed by the art directors Robert Herlth and Walter Röhrig. The premiere took place in Berlin on 11 February 1925.

Cast
 Arthur Kraußneck as Burgherr von Grieshuus
 Paul Hartmann as Junker Hinrich
 Rudolf Forster as Junker Detlev
 Rudolf Rittner as Owe Heiken
 Lil Dagover as Bärbe
 Gertrude Welcker as Gesine
 Gertrud Arnold as Matte
 Hanspeter Peterhans as Enzio
 Christian Bummerstedt as Christof
 Josef Peterhans as Bereiter

References

Bibliography
 Bock, Hans-Michael & Bergfelder, Tim. The Concise CineGraph. Encyclopedia of German Cinema. Berghahn Books, 2009.

External links

1925 films
Films based on German novels
Films based on works by Theodor Storm
Films of the Weimar Republic
Films set in the 17th century
German silent feature films
Films with screenplays by Thea von Harbou
Films produced by Erich Pommer
German black-and-white films
1920s historical drama films
German historical drama films
UFA GmbH films
Films shot at Babelsberg Studios
Silent historical drama films
1920s German films
1920s German-language films